James Shields may refer to:

James Shields (baseball) (born 1981), American baseball player
James Shields (politician, born 1762) (1762–1831), U.S. Representative from Ohio
James Shields (politician, born 1806) (1806–1879), U.S. Senator from Illinois, Minnesota, and Missouri
Shaemas O'Sheel (1886–1954), Irish-American poet, born James Shields
James Shields (Volk), an 1893 bronze sculpture of James Shields by Leonard Volk
James Shields (academic) (1918–1978), Scottish psychiatric geneticist

See also
Jimmy Shields (disambiguation)